Natalia Expósito Reyes (born 20 October 1997) is a Spanish footballer who plays as a goalkeeper for Madrid CFF.

Club career
Expósito started her career at Atlético Madrid C.

References

External links
Profile at La Liga

1997 births
Living people
Women's association football goalkeepers
Spanish women's footballers
Footballers from Madrid
Atlético Madrid Femenino players
Madrid CFF players
Rayo Vallecano Femenino players
Primera División (women) players